TymeBank is an exclusively digital retail bank based in South Africa.

Digital banking 
Headquartered in Rosebank, Johannesburg, TymeBank does not have any physical bank branches and relies on an Android banking App, an Internet Banking site and a partnership with two retail chains, Pick n Pay and Boxer, to host a national network of self-service kiosks that facilitate the account opening process.

The Prudential Authority of the South African Reserve Bank (SARB), granted permission for TymeBank to operate exclusively online on 28 September 2017.

Banking in the cloud 
TymeBank is the first bank in South Africa to put its core-banking platform in the cloud. 85% of TymeBank's systems are AWS cloud applications that provide system scalability, uniform security and cost efficiencies. TymeBank's use of technology and the strategic relationship with Pick n Pay and Boxer stores eliminates the need for physical branches. The reduced operating costs and the national presence of the retail stores removes the barriers that have traditionally prevented an estimated 11 million unbanked South Africans from accessing banking services.

History 
"Tyme" (Take Your Money Everywhere)*people who received their money from time bank. This originally developed as part of a Deloitte Consulting project, funded by the and telecommunications provider, MTN Group. It went on to become a stand-alone business in June 2012. In 2015, the Commonwealth Bank of Australia (CBA) acquired 100% of Tyme, and renamed the business TymeDigital by Commonwealth Bank SA. On 28 September 2017, TymeDigital secured an operating licence from the South African Reserve Bank (SARB). It was the first full banking licence to be issued by the SARB since 1999. 
 
In 2018, financial services company, ARC Imali-Madi (RF), bought a 10% stake in TymeDigital. On 5 November 2018, African Rainbow Capital Financial Services Holdings - owned by South African entrepreneur Patrice Motsepe - obtained approval from the South African Reserve Bank to acquire CBSA’s 90% majority stake in the business. The name of the business was changed in November 2018 from TymeDigital by CommonwealthBank SA to Tyme Bank Limited.

TymeBank soft-launched on 5 November 2018, allowing consumers to open a basic transactional bank account at a limited number of kiosks in Pick n Pay Stores as well as online.

Ownership 
Previously wholly owned by African Rainbow Capital Financial Services Holdings, on 10 June 2019 African Rainbow Capital (ARC) and Ethos Private Equity jointly announced an investment of R200 million by the Ethos Artificial Intelligence (AI) Fund and co-investors (jointly Ethos AI Fund) into Tyme Bank Holdings. The transaction is subject to all conditions precedent being met.

The investment by the Ethos AI Fund in TymeBank will result in the fund being an 8% shareholder in the bank.

ARC announced in December 2021 that Tencent and CDC Group had become shareholders in TymeBank. This capital raising was expected to support TymeBank's emerging markets expansion.

Business model and milestones 
TymeBank offers a transactional account, money transfer service, savings account and educational App. There are plans to introduce credit cards, unsecured loans, and loans to small and medium-sized enterprises (SME).

On 7 August 2019, TymeBank appointed Tauriq Keraan as the new CEO and by 28 November 2019, the bank had signed up one million customers. By the end of October 2021, TymeBank had four million customers, and it announced partnerships with TFG and Zion Christian Church.

References 

Online banks
Banks of South Africa
Companies based in Johannesburg
Banks established in 2015
South African companies established in 2015